Steve J. Palmer (born November 8, 1975) is an American actor and producer. He is best known for providing the voice and motion capture for Bill Williamson in the 2010 video game Red Dead Redemption, and its 2018 prequel Red Dead Redemption 2.

Early life and career
Steve J. Palmer was born in New Hartford, New York on November 8, 1975. In the late 1970s, his father moved his family to Daytona Beach, Florida. He graduated from Seabreeze High School in the 1990s, later attending Daytona State College. He holds a B.A. in Fine Arts from the University of South Carolina Aiken, and is an alumnus of the iO West.

Filmography

Film

Television

Video games

References

External links

People from New Hartford, New York
1975 births
American male film actors
American male voice actors
American male video game actors
Living people
University of South Carolina alumni